Bolleville is the name of two communes in Normandy, France:

Bolleville, Manche, in the Manche département 
Bolleville, Seine-Maritime, in the Seine-Maritime département